Tappeh is a village in Dowlatabad Rural District, in the Central District of Namin County, Ardabil Province, Iran. At the 2006 census, its population was 20, in 5 families.

References 

Towns and villages in Namin County